Etrek may refer to:

 Atrek River, a river in Iran and Turkmenistan
 Etrek District, a district in Balkan Province, Turkmenistan
 Etrek, Turkmenistan, a city in Balkan Province, Turkmenistan, capital of Etrek District